Scythris ochrantha is a moth of the family Scythrididae. It was described by Edward Meyrick in 1909. It is found in South Africa (KwaZulu-Natal, Mpumalanga, Gauteng) and Zimbabwe.

The wingspan is about 17 mm. The forewings are yellow-ochreous and the hindwings are blackish-grey.

References

ochrantha
Moths described in 1909